"Missing" is a song by English musical duo Everything but the Girl, taken from their eighth studio album, Amplified Heart (1994). It was written by the two band members, Tracey Thorn and Ben Watt, and was produced by Watt and John Coxon. It was taken as the second single off the album on 8 August 1994 by Blanco y Negro Records in the United Kingdom and by Atlantic Records in the United States. It initially did not achieve much success until it was remixed by Todd Terry and re-released in 1995, resulting in worldwide success, peaking at or near the top of the charts in many countries. The release of the remixed version of "Missing" gave an indication of the band's future experimentation with more electronic dance music on subsequent albums.

Musically the song takes in multiple genres. The original version from the album is a more low-tempo influenced song, while the popular Todd Terry remix version is a more up-tempo dance-pop song. Lyrically the song talks about one person missing the other because they have moved away. "Missing" was critically acclaimed by the majority of music critics, who praised the composition and generally considered it a highlight on the album.

Background
Prior to "Missing", Everything but the Girl was most known as an indie band; as with many UK bands of the era, their music had folk and jazz leanings. They had released eight albums prior to Amplified Heart and had a number-three UK singles chart success in 1988 ("I Don't Want to Talk About It"), but were relatively unknown in the United States. "Missing" was recorded as a relaxed-sounding guitar-based popular music song that had earned modest broadcasting airplay on US Adult Contemporary radio. The duo gave the track to house music producer Todd Terry to remix for nightclubs.

Tracey Thorn later explained to Rolling Stone that the song was originally intended as a dance-oriented track:

Composition

According to the music sheet published at Musicnotes.com by Sony/ATV Music Publishing, "Missing" is written in the key of A minor. In vocal range, Thorn's vocals span from the key note of E4 to the key note of G5. The song is set in common time and has a beat of 128 beats per minute. Lauren Barnett from The Guardian recalled the style of music as "monochrome electronic beats." Toponehitwonders.com had said the remix "Add[s] a pulsing disco beat that sounds equally at home."

Critical reception
The song was generally acclaimed by most music critics. Larry Flick from Billboard wrote that "this forlorn love song is bolstered by a springy retro-pop arrangement that is brilliantly tweaked into a credible dance confection by post-producer Todd Terry. Singer Tracey Thorn's performance is a study in affecting, but restrained emotion, and the chorus instantly sticks to the brain." Steve Baltin from Cash Box noted that here, the duo "throw in everything but the sink", concluding with that "the blend is very effective, though, as the song comes off as a mix between Lisa Stansfield and Cowboy Junkies. Ethereal pop that can be danced to isn't much in demand these days, but this winner could change that if given the opportunity." Douglas Wolk from CMJ said it's "a first-rate pairing of songwriting and technology", pairing a torch song and techno-inflected backing tracks. He added that "neither the song nor the grooves are all that hot on their own, but in combination they're great—the kind of heartfelt but not histrionic dancefloor simmer that's been too rare since, say, Lisa Stansfield's heyday a few years ago." 

Dave Sholin from the Gavin Report commented, "What a difference a few months and a remix can make. Miami is where "Missing" has busted big, and where requests tell the story of how broad the appeal of the song really is. Track two, the remix edit, is the one to check out." Chuck Campbell from Knoxville News Sentinel felt that it "achieves a beautifully enchanting chorus". Pan-European magazine Music & Media wrote, "Suddenly hip in the dance milieu due to Tracey Thorn's vocals on Massive Attacks "Protection", these remixes by Todd Terry and Ultramarine a.o. will further speed it up." James Hamilton from Music Week'''s RM Dance Update deemed it "atmospheric" and "melancholy". Ben Turner from Muzik declared it as a "miracle". John Kilgo from The Network Forty viewed it as a "very exciting uptempo groover from this debut artist." James Hunter from Vibe remarked that Terry's remix had allowed singer Tracey Thorn "to grace stateside radios with her rare English soul", adding that her voice "is untouchable".

Retrospective response
Bill Lamb from About.com said that "there has never been a more powerful expression of emotional and sexual longing in pop music than that at the core of 'Missing'." AllMusic was also very positive, highlighting the song as an album standout and rated it with 4 stars out of 5. Stopera and Galindo from BuzzFeed ranked it number 10 in their list of "The 101 Greatest Dance Songs of the '90s" in 2017, commenting, "Have you ever sat and really thought about if the desert actually misses the rain? Like any good song, it makes you think." A writer from Complex noted that the remix "set the world ablaze". Idolator ranked it among "The 50 Best Pop Singles of 1995", calling the song a "noir-ish study in wistful longing, with a hint of lonely-but-relatable stalker in the lyric."

Chart performance
The resulting Todd Terry remixed dance version of "Missing" became a worldwide success, matching Everything But the Girl's best UK chart score of number three in November 1995 and scoring number one on the German singles chart. The song became the duo's first and only US Top 40 entry on the Billboard Hot 100, entering at number 94 for the week ending 12 August 1995. After a long climb, it peaked at number two during 1996 (in its 28th chart week). "Missing" eventually logged 55 weeks on the chart (a record at the time which has since been broken; the single is today the eleventh-longest charting song on the US Hot 100). "Missing" was the first ever single to spend an uninterrupted year on the US Hot 100. It also topped the US Cash Box Top 100. On Radio & Records magazine's CHR/Pop (Mainstream Top 40) tracks chart, "Missing" spent four weeks at number one, and was ranked as the number one song of the year for 1996. The original album version of "Missing" also received airplay on adult contemporary and smooth jazz radio stations in the United States.

Even with its success in the mainstream and in nightclubs, ironically with the remix, the song never entered the US Hot Dance Club Play chart. Everything but the Girl would eventually amass four US dance chart number-ones, with singles released after "Missing", one of which, "Wrong", was the duo's only other single to appear on the Billboard Hot 100.

In addition to its US success, "Missing" topped the Canadian RPM Top Singles, Adult Contemporary, and Dance/Urban charts. In the UK it spent over 20 weeks on the UK Singles Chart and earned the duo a double platinum certification from the British Phonographic Industry (BPI), denoting sales and streams of over 1,200,000 units. The song was also successful in Australia and New Zealand. It peaked at number two in Australia, staying on the chart for twenty-three weeks. It had similar success in New Zealand, peaking at 14 on the charts and stayed in the charts for fourteen weeks. The song also eventually peaked inside the top ten in many European countries, including Austria, Belgium (Flanders and Wallonia), France, the Netherlands, Norway, Sweden, and Switzerland. To date, it is the group's most successful single in the charts.

The single has sold three million copies worldwide.

Music video
An accompanying music video was shot for the single (both the original and dance versions). It was directed by English director Mark Szaszy. The video features both Thorn and Watt in an apartment, having split up but them missing each other. It also features Thorn walking around Balham and Clapham South. The video for the Todd Terry Remix was later published on YouTube in June 2018. By October 2022, it has amassed more than 17 million views.

Impact and legacy
In 2003, Q Magazine ranked "Missing" at number 177 in their list of the 1001 Best Songs Ever.

In 2011, Fedde le Grand remixed the song and DJ Ron Slomowicz from About.com listed the song as Song of the Day. He said "Tracey's mournful voice fit perfectly over Todd's house beats to become a club classic and a pop hit around the world." Bill Lamb from the same publication ranked the song at top spot on his Top 10 Best Songs of 1996. He later reviewed the remix saying "pumps up the tempo, adds some beats but thankfully stays true to the original." Toponehitwonders.com. was very positive stating Missing' ... is a tremendous pop song. One of the best of the 1990s. In fact, I would place it in the same company as 'You Get What You Give' by New Radicals as a nearly perfect pop song." They later complimented the chorus, catchy hook and vocal performance by Thorn.

In 2012, the song was listed at number 35 in NMEs list of the 50 best-selling tracks of the 90s, adding: "The 1994 version of 'Missing' had at least a foot on the dancefloor - in defiance of EBTG style - but Todd Terry gave it the final push, his deep house beats complementing Tracey Thorn's rich melancholy pine. Slowly burning, it spent five months on the UK chart and an entire year on the Billboard Hot 100. Sold: 870,000"

In 2018, ThoughtCo placed the song at number one in their list of 10 Best Pop Songs of 1996.

In 2022, Pitchfork featured it on their lists of The 30 Best House Tracks of the '90s and The 250 Best Songs of the 1990s.

Accolades

(*) indicates the list is unordered.

Track listings

 12-inch Maxi "Missing" (Todd Terry Remix (Radio Edit)) – 3:55
 "Missing" (Todd Terry Remix) – 4:00
 "Missing" (Todd Terry Club Mix (US Radio Edit)) – 4:15
 "Missing" (Todd Terry Club Mix) – 5:00
 "Missing" (Todd Terry Extended Original Club Mix) – 9:00
 "Missing" (Rockin' Blue Mix) – 7:47
 "Missing" (Todd Terry Lite Mix) – 4:10
 "Missing" (Todd Terry Tee's Beat) – 2:50
 "Missing" (Chris & James Full on Club Mix) – 8:36

 CD Promotional "Missing" (album version) – 4:10
 "Missing" (Todd Terry Remix (Radio Edit)) – 3:55
 "Missing" (Todd Terry Remix) – 4:00
 "Missing" (Todd Terry Club Mix (US Radio Edit)) – 4:15
 "Missing" (Todd Terry Club Mix) – 5:00
 "Missing" (Todd Terry Extended Original Mix) – 9:00

 CD Maxi "Missing" (Todd Terry Remix (Radio Edit)) – 3:55
 "Missing" (Todd Terry Remix) – 4:00
 "Missing" (Todd Terry Club Mix (US Radio Edit)) – 4:15
 "Missing" (Todd Terry Club Mix) – 5:00
 "Missing" (Todd Terry Extended Original Mix) – 9:00
 "Missing" (Rockin' Blue Mix) – 7:47
 "Missing" (Chris & James Full on Club Mix) – 8:36
 "Missing" (Amplified Heart Album Mix) – 4:04
 "Missing" (Todd Terry Tee's Piece) – 4:35

 CD Maxi – Remixes "Missing" (album version) – 4:10
 "Missing" (Little Joey remix) – 5:03
 "Missing" (Chris & James Full on Club Mix) – 8:36
 "Missing" (Ultramarine remix) – 5:26
 "Missing" (Todd Terry Remix (Radio Edit)) – 3:55
 "Missing" (Todd Terry Remix) – 4:00
 "Missing" (Todd Terry Club Mix (US Radio Edit)) – 4:15
 "Missing" (Todd Terry Club Mix) – 5:00
 "Missing" (Todd Terry Extended Original Mix) – 9:00

Charts

Weekly charts

Year-end charts

All-time charts

Certifications and sales

Release history

No Mercy version

In 1995 No Mercy released their version of the song, which appeared on their debut albums My Promise / No Mercy. Stylistically, the cover is largely based on the remix by Todd Terry, but with a few differences: At the beginning you can hear the chorus, in the instrumentation the acoustic guitar comes more to the fore (Like in Where Do You Go) and in the later choruses you can also hear female backgraund singers in the later choruses. It was released on December 17, 1995, but the success of this dance version throughout Europe was rather modest: in France at number 48, in Germany and Switzerland still in the top 20.

In the music video, the band members of No Mercy are looking for a woman.

Track listings12" Maxi'''
 Missing (I Miss You Like The Deserts Miss The Rain) (Ibiza Club Mix) 6:30
 Missing (I Miss You Like The Deserts Miss The Rain) (Acapella Version) 5:25
 Missing (I Miss You Like The Deserts Miss The Rain) (Manumission Trance Mix) 6:30
 Missing (I Miss You Like The Deserts Miss The Rain) (Radio Version) 3:58

Charts

References

1994 singles
1994 songs
1995 debut singles
1996 singles
2007 singles
Atlantic Records singles
Blanco y Negro Records singles
English house music songs
Everything but the Girl songs
Expatriate (band) songs
No Mercy (pop band) songs
Number-one singles in Denmark
Number-one singles in Germany
Number-one singles in Hungary
Number-one singles in Iceland
Number-one singles in Italy
RPM Top Singles number-one singles
Songs about loneliness
Songs written by Ben Watt
Songs written by Tracey Thorn
Torch songs